Commonwealth Games England (CGE) is the national Commonwealth Games Association for England. The council is responsible for supporting and managing the participation of Team England at the Commonwealth Games'.

Predecessor 
The Commonwealth Games Council for England (CGCE) was originally responsible for 'Team England' and oversaw each team between the 1930 British Empire Games and Melbourne 2006 Commonwealth Games and the England teams at the Commonwealth Youth Games.

Membership of the Games Council consisted of representatives from 26 different sports on the Commonwealth Games' Sports Programme, supported by a small salaried team.CGCE's President was gold medallist Sir Christopher Chataway, the first ever winner of the BBC's Sports Personality of the Year award  and a teammate of Sir Roger Bannister.

Present organisation 

Following a review in 2009, the Commonwealth Games Council for England was disbanded and a new organisation, Commonwealth Games England, was established in its place. CGE is governed by a board of Non-executive Directors, chaired by Ian Metcalfe.  The Board is made up of experts from fields including sport, marketing and finance including England Hockey player Alex Danson and co-founder of Carphone Warehouse and British Olympic Association non-executive director David Ross and National Director at the English Institute of Sport (EIS) Nigel Walker

England's gold medal-winning heptathlete Denise Lewis was named as president in 2016 and succeeds double gold medal winner Dame Kelly Holmes (2009–2015) and Sir Christopher Chataway.

Funding 

Since 1994, the costs of the preparation of Team England have been supported with funding from Sport England, a public body that distributes public and lottery funds. The raising of funds for the team's participation in the Games themselves is the sole responsibility of CGE and is raised through sponsorship and fundraising activities.

Identity 

In the run-up to the 2010 Commonwealth Games, CGE adopted a new logo and brand identity. The logo features a single red English lion representing strength, power and performance.

See also 
 British Olympic Association
 British Paralympic Association

References

External links
Commonwealth Games England

 

England
England at the Commonwealth Games
Holborn
Organisations based in the London Borough of Camden
Sport in the London Borough of Camden
Sports governing bodies in the United Kingdom